Moscow railway station may refer to one of the ten rail terminals in the capital of Russia:

Moscow Belorussky railway station, serving long distance trains to regions west and south-west 
Moscow Kazansky railway station, serving eastbound lines to Kazan and Ryazan
Moscow Kiyevsky railway station, serving regular services to Kyiv
Moscow Kursky railway station, serving trains toward Kursk and into Ukraine, and toward Nizhniy Novgorod
Moscow Leningradsky railway station, serving north-western directions including Saint Petersburg, Estonia, and Finland
Moscow Paveletsky railway station, serving lines radiating south-east from Moscow 
Moscow Rizhsky railway station, serving suburban trains and Latvia
Moscow Savyolovsky railway station, serving suburban directions north of the city
Moscow Vostochny railway station, an interchange station on the Little Ring of the Moscow Railway
Moscow Yaroslavsky railway station, serving eastern destinations

See also
Moskovsky Rail Terminal (disambiguation)
:Category:Railway stations in Moscow